Le Center is a city in Le Sueur County, Minnesota, United States. The population was 2,517 at the 2020 census. It is the county seat of Le Sueur County. The Le Sueur County Courthouse and Jail are listed on the National Register of Historic Places.

Geography

Le Center is located 26 miles from Mankato and 62 miles from Minneapolis.

Minnesota State Highways 99 and 112 are two of the main routes in the community.

Demographics

As of 2000 the median income for a household in the city was $38,690, and the median income for a family was $47,143. Males had a median income of $30,901 versus $22,381 for females. The per capita income for the city was $17,225. About 6.6% of families and 7.6% of the population were below the poverty line, including 4.3% of those under age 18 and 17.3% of those age 65 or over.

2010 census
As of the census of 2010, there were 2,499 people, 915 households, and 629 families residing in the city. The racial makeup of the city was 89.2% White, 0.2% African American, 0.2% Native American, 1.4% Asian, 8.4% from other races, and 0.5% from two or more races. Hispanic or Latino of any race were 21.0% of the population.

There were 915 households, of which 37.9% had children under the age of 18 living with them, 52.5% were married couples living together, 9.4% had a female householder with no husband present, 6.9% had a male householder with no wife present, and 31.3% were non-families. 27.1% of all households were made up of individuals, and 11.4% had someone living alone who was 65 years of age or older. The average household size was 2.67 and the average family size was 3.25.

The median age in the city was 32.8 years. 28.5% of residents were under the age of 18; 8.4% were between the ages of 18 and 24; 28.2% were from 25 to 44; 22.2% were from 45 to 64; and 12.6% were 65 years of age or older. The gender makeup of the city was 50.9% male and 49.1% female.

2020 Census 
As of the census of 2020, there were 2,517 people, 923 households, and 181 families living in the city.

Climate

Le Center has a humid continental climate (Köppen Dfa). Summers are warm and humid, while winters are cold and snowy.

References

External links

 Official website
 Tri-City United Public Schools

Cities in Minnesota
Cities in Le Sueur County, Minnesota
County seats in Minnesota